V-League 2007 was the 51st season of Vietnam's professional football league. Petro Vietnam was the league's sponsor for the first time, replacing Eurowindow.

Bình Dương F.C. won their first title in this season, beating out two-time champions Đồng Tâm Long An F.C.

League table

Play-off

External links
Vietnam Football Federation

Vietnamese Super League seasons
Vietnam
Vietnam
1